The city of Douglasville is the county seat of Douglas County, Georgia, United States. , the city had a population of 34,650, up from 30,961 in 2010 and 20,065 in 2000.

Highway access can be obtained via three interchanges along Interstate 20.

History
Located along a natural rise in the topography, Douglasville was originally known as "Skint Chestnut." The name was derived from a large tree used by Native Americans as a landmark; it was stripped of its bark so as to be more conspicuous.

Douglasville was founded in 1874 as the railroad was constructed in the area. That same year, Douglasville was designated as the county seat of the recently formed Douglas County. The community was named for Senator Stephen A. Douglas of Illinois.

Georgia General Assembly first incorporated Douglasville in 1875.

On September 21, 2009, Douglas County was devastated by the worst flood in Georgia history. Over  of rain fell in one night, destroying many roads and homes. The county was later declared a disaster area, and the governor of Georgia declared a state of emergency. The flooding most affected the areas of Douglasville, Villa Rica, Austell, Lithia Springs, and Chapel Hill. The disaster killed more than eight people in the county, most of them in the Douglasville area.

Geography
Douglasville is located in north-central Douglas County at  (33.749824, −84.723190). Interstate 20 passes south of downtown, leading east  to downtown Atlanta and west  to Birmingham, Alabama. I-20 provides access to the city from exits 34, 36, and 37.

Demographics

2020 Census

As of the 2020 United States Census, there were 34,650 people, 12,675 households, and 7,833 families residing in the city.

2010 Census
As of the census of 2010, there were 30,961 people, 11,627 households, and 7,692 families residing in the city. The racial makeup of the city was 55.9% African American, 36.0% White (33.4% Non-Hispanic White), 0.2% Native American, 1.8% Asian, 0.1% Pacific Islander, 3.3% from other races, and 2.8% from two or more races. 7.2% of the population were Hispanic or Latino of any race.

There were 11,627 households, out of which 36.9% had children under the age of 18 living with them, 39.3% were married couples living together, 21.7% had a female householder with no husband present, and 33.8% were non-families. 28.3% of all households were made up of individuals, and 5.4% had someone living alone who was 65 years of age or older. The average household size was 2.58 and the average family size was 3.18.

In the city, the population was spread out, with 28.3% under the age of 18, 9.5% from 18 to 24, 33.2% from 25 to 44, 22.2% from 45 to 64, and 6.8% who were 65 years of age or older. The median age was 32.7 years. For every 100 females, there were 87.8 males. For every 100 females age 18 and over, there were 83.3 males.

The median income for a household in the city was $47,596, and the median income for a family was $54,375. Males had a median income of $45,933 versus $39,675 for females. The per capita income for the city was $26,002. 15.9% of the population and 14.1% of families were below the poverty line. Out of the total population, 22.2% of those under the age of 18 and 15.1% of those 65 and older were living below the poverty line.

2000 Census
As of the census of 2000, there were 20,065 people, 7,286 households, and 5,078 families residing in the city. The racial makeup of the city was 63.84% White, 30.29% African American, 0.31% Native American, 1.73% Asian, 0.01% Pacific Islander, 1.69% from other races, and 2.13% from two or more races. 3.99% of the population were Hispanic or Latino of any race.

There were 7,286 households, out of which 38.3% had children under the age of 18 living with them, 48.2% were married couples living together, 16.9% had a female householder with no husband present, and 30.3% were non-families. 22.8% of all households were made up of individuals, and 5.6% had someone living alone who was 65 years of age or older. The average household size was 2.68 and the average family size was 3.16.

In the city, the population was spread out, with 28.3% under the age of 18, 11.1% from 18 to 24, 34.4% from 25 to 44, 19.6% from 45 to 64, and 6.6% who were 65 years of age or older. The median age was 31 years. For every 100 females, there were 94.8 males. For every 100 females age 18 and over, there were 91.0 males.

The median income for a household in the city was $45,289, and the median income for a family was $52,340. Males had a median income of $37,464 versus $27,038 for females. The per capita income for the city was $22,283. 12.2% of the population and 10.1% of families were below the poverty line. Out of the total population, 17.3% of those under the age of 18 and 8.1% of those 65 and older were living below the poverty line.

Economy
The historic Downtown hosts many shops and eateries. A vibrant business area in Douglasville is located south of the city between Chapel Hill Road and Georgia State Route 5, around the Douglas Boulevard Corridor. Arbor Place Mall is located in this area, as are many major retail stores and fast food chains.

The Fairburn Road area also hosts many shops, food stores and fast food spots. Some vacated to make way for an expansion of the highway in early 2008. Expansion is aided by the Douglasville Development Authority (described below).

In recent years, the historic downtown district and surrounding areas have become favorite backdrops for the film industry. Productions include Netflix's Stranger Things (2016), The Founder (2015), Mocking Jay Part 1 (2014), Catching Fire (2013), Finding Carter (MTV series 2014), and Kill the Messenger (2014).

Top employers
According to Douglasville's 2011 Comprehensive Annual Financial Report, the top employers in the city are:

The Douglasville CAFR table of principal employers (p. 77) does not show public employees.  The Douglas County School System currently employs over 3,550 people, including teachers, administrators, and support staff.

Arts and culture

Points of interest

The Central Business District of downtown Douglasville is listed on the National Register of Historic Places as a historic district; it is an outstanding example of a turn-of-the-century southern railroad town. The majority of the buildings are one- and two-story brick structures dating from the mid-19th century into the mid-20th century. Most are of Victorian-era commercial design set flush with the sidewalk. The buildings' styles include Romanesque, Italianate, and Queen Anne. Many of the doorways and windows have Gothic arched openings and hooded windows. The dominant landscape feature is the railroad right-of-way running east-to-west through downtown.

In the center of town is a small plaza, which was converted from a street block, known as O'Neal Plaza (named after the former O'Neal's department store, now used as the Douglasville City Hall). The plaza features a small performance venue and concrete fountain. It is home to many festivals year round. This is the site of the annual Christmas Tree Lighting Festival.

 The Douglasville Convention & Visitors Bureau is located in the heart of downtown and serves as the city's welcome center.
 The Douglas County Cultural Arts Center is located at Campbellton Street, south of Downtown. The center holds art shows and special events throughout the year, and hosts events for schools across the county. Classes for a variety of visual and performing arts are available year-round for all ages.
 The courthouse on Hospital Drive hosts the Douglasville Farmers and Artisans Market  every Wednesday from 4 pm until 7 pm, from April until November. 
 The Douglasville Downtown Conference Center is located at 6701 Church Street. It hosts corporate meetings, community events, and social gatherings. Summit Church of West Georgia meets here on Sunday mornings. The  conference center, with a two-level, 300-space parking deck, opened in early 2013. It has a  ballroom space that can be divided into five rooms. It includes a 150-seat auditorium, a 15-person boardroom, a business center, three meeting rooms, two pre-function spaces, bride and groom dressing rooms, and a terrace in the back. 
 The Douglas County Museum of History and Art on West Broad Street is housed in the county's historic 1956 courthouse, which has been preserved for its unique mid-century modern architecture and is listed in the National Register for Historic Places. The museum features an exhibit of county history as well as seasonal displays. 
 Arbor Place Mall is home to over 100 shops and restaurants. The anchor stores are Dillard's, Macy's, Belk, J.C. Penney, Old Navy and Bed Bath & Beyond. The mall sponsors many festivals, as well as Douglasville's July 4 celebrations.

Parks and recreation
 Hunter Park is Douglasville's largest park, and is home to the county Boys & Girls Club. Many festivals, sports activities, and recreational activities take place here. The park features a playground, wildlife pond and trail, seven tennis courts, 11 baseball/softball fields, including one designed for the handicapped, and an 18-hole disc golf course that opened in 2015. The small train for children that operated during the summer no longer exists, but the track for the train still remains. The park is named after the late 1st Lt. "Jerry" Hunter (USAF), Douglas County's first casualty of the Vietnam War.
 Boundary Waters Park, located on GA Highway 92 North/Highway 166 East, has several pools which are open to the public. The Boundary Waters Aquatic Center  features an eight-lane, 25-yard heated competition pool and a four-lane, heated therapeutic/teaching pool. The center is home to the Douglas County Stingrays swim team as well as local high school and Special Olympics swim teams. The park complex includes an array of ball fields, walking and horseriding trails, and an 18-hole disc golf course In late 2021, the new Boundary Waters Activity Center opened up in the park. The new facility has two basketball courts, an indoor walking track, and a fitness room. 
This 66-acre park features softball fields, a sand volleyball court, an 18-hole disc golf course, tennis courts, a gymnasium, and batting cages. It also hosts a three-acre fishing lake with a pier, playground, an amphitheater, gazebo, group shelters, and restroom facilities.
 The West Pines Golf Club was purchased by the city in 2003 and is now operated as a public course.
 The Fowler Field Soccer Complex is located in the southwest part of the city, on Chapel Hill Road.
 The Chestnut Log Soccer Complex is located on Pope Road beside Chestnut Log Middle School, about ½ mile west of SR 92 (Fairburn Road).
 Jesse Davis Park is located north of downtown Douglasville and serves as a neighborhood park for residents of North Douglasville. The park was recently renovated, and has a playground and a community swimming pool.
The park has  of wooded trails that follow the stream to the ruins of the New Manchester Manufacturing Company, a textile mill burned during the Civil War. The park has a  lake with two fishing docks, canoe and fishing boat rentals, 11 picnic shelters, playground, visitors center and museum.

Government
In 2015, the city elected Rochelle Robinson as its first female and first African American mayor.

The City Council is elected from single-member districts.

Law enforcement
The Douglasville police chief is Gary Sparks. The Douglasville Police Department is located at 2083 Fairburn Road. The sheriff is Tim Pounds, and the Douglas County Sheriff's Office is located at 8470 Earl D Lee Boulevard in Douglasville.

Education
Education in Douglasville is varied, with a large public school system and many private schools. The Douglas County School District operates 21 elementary schools, eight middle schools, and five high schools, covering grades pre-K to 12th grade.

Douglasville hosts a campus ("instructional site") of Georgia Highlands College. Nearby universities and colleges include Strayer College, West Georgia Technical College, and Mercer University.

Douglasville has numerous secular and religious private schools, including:

 Harvester Christian Academy
 Heirway Christian Academy
The International Montessori Academy
 The Kings Way Christian School
 Primrose School at Brookmont
 Saint Rose Academy
 Sunbrook Academy at Chapel Hill
 Chapelhill Christian School

Media
Douglasville is served by the Douglas County Sentinel, a three-day-a-week publication that covers local and state news and by All On Georgia - Douglas, a hyperlocal digital news organization that covers local, state and national news, daily. Chapel Hill News & Views also serves Douglasville as a monthly magazine with 45,000 circulation.

Infrastructure

Transportation
 U.S. Highway 78 (State Route 8, Veterans' Memorial Highway) runs directly east to west through downtown Douglasville.
 State Route 92 runs north to southeast just ¼ of a mile to the east of downtown as a truck route designed to keep large trucks from crossing an elevated railroad crossing at Campbellton Street. The city and the Georgia DOT are working on plans to reroute Highway 92 farther east of downtown on a four-lane bridge serving as a bypass.
 State Route 5 is colocated with US 78 through downtown east to the Cobb County line and west just past Hunter Park. Highway 5 continues in a southwesterly direction through the village of Bill Arp and crosses into Carroll County near Whitesburg.

 
Historically, the Southern Railway ran several daily passenger trains, including the Kansas City-Florida Special, the Sunnyland and an Atlanta-Birmingham section of the Piedmont Limited, making flag or signal stops in Douglasville. The last trains made stops in 1967. Today, the nearest passenger service is Amtrak's Crescent in Atlanta, 26.4 miles to the east.

Healthcare
Residents of Douglasville are served by the Wellstar Douglas Hospital located at 8954 Hospital Drive.

Douglasville Development Authority
The primary goals of the City of Douglasville Development Authority (CDDA) are to promote the economic prosperity of the city while simultaneously increasing the existing industry and business sectors in order to raise the quality of life for the city's residents. The City Development Authority also focuses on education in order successfully promote the labor force.

In the fall of 2009, an area of interest for the CDDA was the reconstruction and widening of Highway 92, which runs through the heart of the city. This major roadway reconstruction was expected to have a significant impact on the city and its ability to promote economic development.

Notable people

 George Bello, American soccer player for Arminia Bielefeld
 Asia Durr, WNBA player for the Atlanta Dream
 Janie Lou Gibbs, serial killer and poisoner, died in a nursing home after being diagnosed with Parkinson's disease after being released from prison
 Terry Harper, former outfielder for the Atlanta Braves
 Brian Heidik, winner of Survivor: Thailand
 Bill Hembree, politician from Georgia.
 Norma Jean, metalcore band
 Walton Goggins, actor best known for his role as Boyd Crowder in Justified. Though he was born in Birmingham Alabama, his family relocated to Douglasville for his formative years. He eventually graduated from Lithia Springs High School
 Priscilla Kelly, professional wrestler known in WWE as Gigi Dolin

References

External links
 
 City of Douglasville official website
 City of Douglasville Development Authority
 Douglasville Convention & Visitors Bureau

Cities in Douglas County, Georgia
County seats in Georgia (U.S. state)
Cities in Georgia (U.S. state)
Populated places established in 1875
1875 establishments in Georgia (U.S. state)
Georgia populated places on the Chattahoochee River
Cities in the Atlanta metropolitan area